Muldoon is an Irish surname.

Muldoon may also refer to:

People 
 Solid Muldoon, a supposedly preserved prehistoric body, actually a hoax
 Sgt. Muldoon (pro-wrestler) ring name of John Callahan (wrestler)

Places 
 Muldoon, Anchorage, Alaska, USA; a major neighborhood in Anchorage
 Muldoon, Texas, USA
 Muldoon Park, Anchorage, Alaska, USA; a park
 Muldoon Park, Pelham, New Hampshire, USA; a town park
 Muldoon Canyon Formation, Idaho, USA

Other uses
 Muldoon's, Mounds View, Minnesota, USA; a music venue
 James P. Muldoon River Center, Saint Mary's City, Maryland, USA; a marine biology lab
 Muldoon government (1974-1984) New Zealand national government led by Prime Minister Robert Muldoon

See also

 
 
 Curse of Muldoon